Moon Lake may refer to:

Geography

Canada
Moon Lake (British Columbia), a lake on Mission Ridge in British Columbia
Moon Lake, a lake in Riding Mountain National Park, Manitoba
Moon Lake, a lake in Manitoba, source of the Minago River
Moon Lake, a lake of Nova Scotia

China
Moon Lake (Ningbo), a lake

India, Himalayas
 Chandra Taal, Lake of the Moon

United States
 Moon Lakes in Arkansas County, Arkansas
 Moon Lake in Desha County, Arkansas
 Moon Lake in Monroe County, Arkansas
 Moon Lake in Ouachita County, Arkansas
 Moon Lake in White County, Arkansas
Moon Lake, Florida, an unincorporated community in Pasco County
Moon Lake (Berrien County, Michigan), a lake
Moon Lake (Minnesota), a lake in Douglas County
Moon Lake (Mississippi), a lake in Coahoma County
Moon Lake, Mississippi, an unincorporated community in Mississippi
Moon Lake (Jefferson County, New York), a lake
Moon Lake State Forest Recreation Area, Luzerne County, Pennsylvania
Moon Lake (Utah), a lake

Other uses
Moon Lake (film), a 2009 Bulgarian-German-French art film by Ivan Stanev